Jona Malanicagi Nareki is a New Zealand rugby union player who plays for the  in Super Rugby. His playing position is wing. He has signed for the Highlanders squad in 2020.

Reference list

External links
itsrugby.co.uk profile

1997 births
New Zealand rugby union players
Living people
Rugby union wings
Otago rugby union players
Highlanders (rugby union) players